Primorskaya is the station of the Nevsko–Vasileostrovskaya Line (Line 3) of the Saint Petersburg Metro. It was designed by V.N. Sokolov, M.I. Starodubov and V.A. Penno and opened on 28 September 1979. The opening of the station, situated in the western part of Vasilievsky Island, was designed to coincide with the expansion of the local neighborhoods. Like many stations built during the Cold War era, it was designed to double as a fallout shelter. Thus, the underground portion of the station features a set of blast doors a few meters before the escalator. The station's exit vestibule was eventually expanded to house one of the system's communication centers. The building also hosts a metro museum and Metropoliten cafe.

Local landmarks
It is also fairly close to Novosmolenskaya Cemetery, the city's first cemetery

Recent developments and plans
The station is slated to have a transfer link to the Pravoberezhnaya Line. The station it will link to will probably be called Primorskaya II. However, the construction is unlikely to be completed before 2015 at the very earliest.

The extension of the line north to Novokrestovskaya and Begovaya opened on 26 May 2018.

Transit links
 Tramway - Route 6
 Trolleybus - Route 10
 Municipal Bus - Routes 1, 6, 7, 47, 152
 Marshrutka - К-6к, К-38, К-44, К-44а, К-120, К-124, К-162, К-175а, К-183, К-186, К-273, К-247, К-248, К-309, К-359, К-362, К-690.

References

External links

Станция "Приморская"

Saint Petersburg Metro stations
Railway stations in Russia opened in 1979
Railway stations located underground in Russia